Herbert Harris was a politician.

Herbert Harris may also refer to:

Herb Harris (1913–1991), baseball player
Herbert Harris, protagonist in Village of Daughters
Herbert Harris, co-founder of Stinson Records

See also
Bert Harris (disambiguation)